Reading was one of 8 teams in the "outlaw" United States Baseball League based in Reading, Pennsylvania. The league folded after just over a month of play. Reading was the only team in the league without a nickname.

1912 Standings 
Reading finished 3rd at 12-9 in the USBL's only season.

Notable players
 Jack Cronin

References 

Defunct baseball teams in Pennsylvania
United States Baseball League teams
 
1912 establishments in Pennsylvania
1912 disestablishments in Pennsylvania
Baseball teams established in 1912
Professional baseball teams in Pennsylvania
Baseball teams disestablished in 1912